Zlatko Savović (born September 20, 1980) is a Bosnian-American former professional basketball player.

Early life 
Born in Banja Luka, Yugoslavia to a Bosnian Serb father Božidar and a Bosniak mother Behrija. In 1993, he moved to Everett, Washington with his parents. There he attended Everett High School.

College career 
A point guard, Savović played four seasons of college basketball at the Lehigh University from 1999 to 2003. In his senior year, he recorded 14.6 points, 4.1 rebounds, 4.1 assists, and 1.5 steals per game and was named to the All-Patriot League First-Team in the 2002–03 season.

He holds a bachelor's degree in mechanical engineering from Lehigh University.

Professional career 
After went undrafted in the 2003 NBA Draft, Savović moved to Europe where played professionally for Ventspils (Latvia) and Crvena zvezda (ABA League).

In 2010, Savović joined the Tacoma Thunder of the National Athletic Basketball League.

References

External links
 
 Zlatko Savovic at sports-reference.com
 Zlatko Savovic at eurobasket.com
 Zlatko Savovic at realgm.com
 Zlatko Savovic at proballers.com
 Zlatko Savovic at aba-liga.com
 Zlatko Savovic at euroleague.net

1980 births
Living people
ABA League players
American expatriate basketball people in Latvia
American expatriate basketball people in Serbia
American mechanical engineers
American men's basketball players
American people of Bosnia and Herzegovina descent
Basketball players from Washington (state)
BK Ventspils players
Bosnia and Herzegovina expatriate basketball people in Serbia
Bosnia and Herzegovina expatriate basketball people in the United States
Bosnia and Herzegovina men's basketball players
KK Crvena zvezda players
Lehigh Mountain Hawks men's basketball players
Point guards
Sportspeople from Banja Luka
Yugoslav Wars refugees